Bláhová  is a village and municipality in the Dunajská Streda District in the Trnava Region of south-west Slovakia.

It has a post-office. There is a football playground and a public library in the village.

History
Census 2011 - 356 inhabitants:
199 (56%) Slovaks, 112 (31%) Hungarians and 45 (13%) others nationality.

In the 9th century Great Moravian part, past year 906  the territory of Blahová became part of the Kingdom of Hungary.
After the Austro-Hungarian army disintegrated in November 1918, Czechoslovak troops occupied the area, later acknowledged internationally by the Treaty of Trianon. Between 1938 and 1945 Blahová once more  became part of Miklós Horthy's Hungary through the First Vienna Award. From 1945 until the Velvet Divorce, it was part of Czechoslovakia. Since then it has been part of Slovakia.

References

Villages and municipalities in Dunajská Streda District
Hungarian communities in Slovakia